Wilhelm Wiesberg (13 September 1850 – 25 August 1896), real name Wilhelm Bergamenter, was an Austrian writer and folksinger.

Life 
Born in Vienna, Wiesberg acted in children's comedies at the Vienna Theater in der Josefstadt and was an employee of the magazines Figaro, Kikeriki, Zeitgeist and Der Floh. After he lost his job, he became a folk singer. Wiesberg wrote 72 Posse mit Gesang, 30 solo scenes and more than 1000 songs. He often worked together with Johann Sioly and Wilhelm Seidl.

Wiesberg died in Vienna at age 45. His grave is located at the Dornbacher Friedhof in Vienna (Gruppe 3, Nummer 12).

Work 
 1875: Der Kaninchenfresser, Schwank mit Gesang.
 1885, 1886: Mein’ Vaterstadt in Lied und Wort. [5 volumes].
 1885: Wiener Couplets für Pianoforte und Gesang, gesungen von Wiesberg.
 1885: Duette für 2 Singstimmen und Pianoforte v. Seidl und Wiesberg.
 1890: Eine kleine Tanz-Chronik
 1891: À la Klapphorn. Posse.
 1893: Fest-Gedicht zur 25jähr. Gründungs-Feier des demokratischen Vereines am Neubau. 
 1894: Draußt und herinn, couplet for Josef Modl
 All's fahrt am Rad!, Scherzlied, music Johann Sioly
 Da hat der Aff a Freud
 Das is G'schmacksachn, komisches Originallied
 Der Trompeter von Säckingen, Solo scene for Josef Modl
 Die letzte Stunde eines Junggesellen, Solo scene
Die Näherin!, music: Johann Sioly

Further reading 
 Constantin von Wurzbach: Wiesberg, Wilhelm. In Biographisches Lexikon des Kaiserthums Oesterreich. 56th part. Kaiserlich-königliche Hof- und Staatsdruckerei, Vienna 1888, Read online 
 Christian Fastl: "Wiesberg, Wilhelm." In Oesterreichisches Musiklexikon. Online-edition, Vienna 2002 ff., ; print edition: volume 5, Austrian Academy of Sciences publishing house, Vienna 2006.

References

External links 
 Nachruf auf Willhelm Wiesberg in "Wiener Bilder", 6 September 1896, page 11 (bei Austrian Newspapers online)
 

19th-century Austrian writers
19th-century Austrian male singers
Wienerlied
1850 births
1896 deaths
Writers from Vienna